Awards received by Professor Muhammad Yunus, the founder of Grameen Bank:

 1978 — President's Award, Bangladesh
 1984 — Ramon Magsaysay Award, Philippines
 1985 — Bangladesh Bank Award, Bangladesh
 1987 — Shwadhinota Dibosh Puroshkar (Independence Day Award), Bangladesh
 1989 — Aga Khan Award for Architecture, Switzerland
 1993 — CARE Humanitarian Award
 1994 — World Food Prize.
 1994 — Pfeffer Peace Prize, US
 1994 — Dr. Mohammad Ibrahim Memorial Gold Medal Award, Bangladesh
 1994 — Tun Abdul Razak Award, Malaysia
 1995 — Max Schmidheiny Freedom Prize,
 1995 - Rotary SEED (Science, Education and Economic Development) Award of Rotary Club of Metropolitan Dhaka (RCMD), the highest service award in Bangladesh.
 1996 — UNESCO International Simón Bolívar Prize.
 1996 — "Distinguished Alumnus Award" of Vanderbilt University, US
 1997 — Award from the Strømme Foundation, Norway.
 1997 — International Activist Award, U.S.A
 1997 — Planetary Consciousness Business Innovation Prize
 1997 — State of the World Forum Award by the State of the World Forum, San Francisco
 1997 — Man for Peace Award by the Together For Peace Foundation, Italy
 1998 — Indira Gandhi Prize
 1998 — Prince of Asturias Award
 1998 — Sydney Peace Prize
 1998 — One World Broadcasting Trust Special Award by the One World Broadcasting Trust, UK
 1998 — Ozaki (Gakudo) Award by the Ozaki Yukio Memorial Foundation, Japan
 1998 — Juste of the Year Award by the Les Justes D'or, France
 1999 — Rotary Award for World Understanding by the Rotary International, US
 1999 — Golden Pegasus Award by the TUSCAN Regional Government, Italy
 1999 — Roma Award for Peace and Humanitarian Action by the Municipality of Rome, Italy
 1999 — Rathindra Puraskar by the Visva-Bharati, India
 2000 — OMEGA Award of Excellence for Lifetime Achievement, Switzerland
 2000 — The Medal of the Presidency of the Italian Senate, Italy
 2000 — King Hussein Humanitarian Leadership Award by the King Hussein Foundation, Jordan
 2000 — IDEB Gold Medal Award by the Institute of Diploma Engineers, Bangladesh
 2001 — Named Ashoka Global Academy Member
 2001 — Fukuoka Asian Culture Prize (Grand Prize)
 2001 — Artusi prize by Comune di Forlimpopoli, Italy
 2001 — Ho Chi Minh Award by the Ho Chi Minh City Peoples Committee, Vietnam
 2001 — International Cooperation Prize Caja de Granada Caja de Ahorros de Granada, Spain
 2001 — AVARRA International Aid Award by the Autonomous Government of Navarra together with Caja Laboral (Savings Bank), Spain
 2002 — Mahatma Gandhi Award by the M.K Gandhi Institute for Nonviolence, US
 2003 — World Technology Network Award 2003 for Finance by the World Technology Network, UK
 2003 — Volvo Environment Prize 2003 by the Volvo Environment Prize Foundation, Sweden
 2003 — National Merit Order by the Honorable President of the Republic of Colombia, Colombia
 2003 — The Medal of the Painter Oswaldo Guayasamin by the UNESCO, France
 2003 — The Volvo Environment Prize
 2004 — Telecinco Award for Better Path Towards Solidarity by the Spanish TV Netwark - Channel 5, Spain
 2004 — City of Orvieto Award by the Municipality of Orvieto, Italy
 2004 — World Affairs Council Award for Extraordinary Contribution to Social Change by the World Affairs Council of Northern California, US
 2004 — Leadership in Social Entrepreneurship Award by Fuqua School of Business of Duke University, US
 2004 — Premio Galileo 2000 - Special Prize for Peace by Ina Assitalia Fireuze, Italy
 2004 — Nikkei Asia Prize for Regional Growth by the Nihon Keizai Shimbun, Inc. (Nikkei), Japan
 2004 — The Economists first annual Innovation Award for social and economic innovation.
 2005 — Golden Cross of the Civil Order of the Social Solidarity by the Spanish Ministry of Labour and Social Affairs, Spain
 2005 — Freedom Award by the America's Freedom Foundation, Provo, Utah, US
 2005 — Bangladesh Computer Society Gold Medal by the Bangladesh Computer Society, Bangladesh
 2005 — Prize II Ponte by the Fondazione Europea Guido Venosta, Italy
 2005 — Foundation of Justice 2005 by the Foundation of Justice, Valencia, Spain
 2006 — Neustadt Award by Kennedy School of Government, Harvard University, US
 2006 — Global Citizen of the Year Award by Patel Foundation for Global understanding, Tampa, Florida, US
 2006 — Convivencia (Good Fellowship) of Ceuta 2006 by Fundacion Premio Convivencia, Ceuta, Spain
 2006 — Disaster Mitigation Award 2006 by FIRST INDIA Disaster Management Congress 2006, Delhi, India
 2006 — SHERA BANGALEE 2006 by ETV, India
 2006 — Mother Teresa Award instituted by the Mother Teresa International and Millennium Award Committee (MTIMAC), Kolkata, India
 2006 — Freedom from Want Award, one of the Four Freedoms Awards by Roosevelt Study Centre
 2006 — ITU World Information Society Award by International Telecommunication Union
 2006 — Seoul Peace Prize
 2006 — Nobel Peace Prize, shared with Grameen Bank
 2007 — ABICC Award For Leadership in Global Trade 2007 by ABICC, Miami, US
 2007 — Social Entrepreneur Award 2007 by the Geoffrey Palmer Center for Social Entrepreneurship and the Law, Pepperdine School of Law, US
 2007 — Global Entrepreneurship Leader Award 2007 by the National Foundation for Teaching Entrepreneurship, US
 2007 — Red Cross Gold Medal 2007 by the Red Cross Society, Spain
 2007 — Rabindra Nath Tagore Birth Centenary Plaque 2007 by the Asiatic Society, Kolkata, India
 2007 — EFR-Business Week Award 2007 by the University of Rotterdam, Netherland
 2007 — Vision Award 2007 by the Global Economic Network, Berlin, Germany 
 2007 — BAFI Global Achievement Award 2007 by the Bangladesh-American Foundation Inc., US
 2007 — Rubin Museum Mandala Award by the Rubin Museum, US
 2007 — Sakaal Person of the Year Award 2007 by the Sakaal Group of Publications, India 
 2007 — 1st AHPADA Global Award by the ASEAN Handicraft Promotion and Development Association (ASPADA), Philippine
 2007 — Medal of Honor by the Government, Santa Catrina State, Brazil
 2007 — UN South - South Cooperation by the United Nations, US
 2007 — The Nichols-Chancellor's Medal awarded by Vanderbilt University
 2007 — Order of the Liberator in First Class with Grand Decoration awarded by Venezuelan President Hugo Chávez
 2007 — Honoured as an adviser to the government of Hainan province of China.
 2008 — Corine International Book Award by the Bavarian Government, Germany for the book, "Creating World Without Poverty"
 2008 — Project Concern Award by Project Concern International, Santa Barbara, California, US
 2008 — International Women's Health Coalition Award by the International Women's Health Coalition, New York, US
 2008 — The Kitakyushu Environmental Award by the Mayor of City of Kitakyushu, Japan
 2008 — Chancellor's Medal by York College, US
 2008 — President's Medal by Lehman College, US
 2008 — Human Security Award by Muslim Public Affairs Council, US
 2008 — 2008 Annual Award for Development by OPEC Fund for International Development(OFID), Austria
 2008 — 2008 Humanitarian Award by The International Association of Lions Clubs, US
 2008 — Friend of Children 2008 by Save the Children, Spain
 2008 — AGI International Science by University of Cologne, Germany
 2008 — TWO WING prize 2008 by the Freie Universitat, Berlin, Germany
 2008 — Global Humanitarian Awards 2008 by the Tech Museum, San Jose, California, US
 2008 — World Affairs Council Awards 2008 by the World Affairs Council of Northern California, San Francisco, California, US
 2008 — The Full Impact Award by Full Circle Fund, US
 2008 — Honorary degrees awarded by Glasgow Caledonian University and the University of Glasgow 
 2009 — Estoril Global Issues Distinguished Book Prize, Portugal
 2009 — Golden Biatec Award by the Economic Club, Slovakia
 2009 — Gold Medal of Honor Award from the ATLAS, US
 2009 — PICMET Leadership in Technology Management, US
 2009 — The Sustainable Development Award 2009 by Ecology and Development Foundation, Spain
 2009 — The Bayreuth Leadership Award 2009 by the University of Bayreuth, Wiesbaden, Germany 
 2009 — The Dwight D. Eisenhower Award for Leadership and Service, awarded by Eisenhower Fellowships in Philadelphia, Pennsylvania
 2009 — Presidential Medal of Freedom awarded by Barack Obama 
 2010 — Social Entrepreneur of the Year Award at The Asian Awards
 2010 — Prize for Ethical Business Award 2010 by the Creighton University, Omaha, US 
 2010 — Presidential Medallion Award 2010 by the President, University of Illinois, Urbana-Champaign, US
 2010 — SolarWorld Einstein Award 2010 by the SolarWorld AG, Germany at the 25th European Phtovoltaic Conference in Valencia, Spain
 2010 — Presidential Medal Award 2010 by the Miami Dade College, Miami, Florida, US
 2010 — The highest national award by the Nation of Peru
 2010 — Global Award, the Third China Poverty Eradication Award
 2010 — Presidential Medal Award 2010 by the Emory University, Atlanta, US  Emory University
 2010 - Congressional Gold Medal awarded by United States Congress
 2011 — St. Vincent de Paul Award by DePaul University, Chicago, Illinois
 2011 — Elon University Medal for Entrepreneurial Leadership, US
 2012 — Jean Mayer Global Citizen Award by the Institute for Global Leadership of Tufts University, US
 2012 — Outstanding Entrepreneur of Our Time and The Best Humanitarian of the Year by OFC Venture Challenge, US
 2012 — Transformational Leadership Award, US
 2012 — International Freedom Award by the National Civil Rights Museum, US
 2013 — Salute to Greatness Award 2013 by Martin Luther King Center, US 
 2013 — Albert Schweitzer Humanitarian Award 2013 by Quinnipiac University, US
 2013 — Global Treasure Award by Skoll Foundation, Oxford, UK 
 2013 — Forbes 400 Philanthropy Forum Lifetime Achievement Award for Social Entrepreneurship by Forbes Magazine, US
 2013 — Asian American/ Asian Research Leadership Award, US
 2021 — Olympic Laurel, International Olympic Committee
 2021 - United Nations Foundation's Champion of Global Change Award.

Yunus received 62 honorary doctorate degrees from universities from Argentina, Australia, Bangladesh, Belgium, Canada, Costa Rica, India, Italy, Japan, Korea, Lebanon, Malaysia, Russia, South Africa, Spain, Thailand, Turkey, UK, United States and Peru.

References

External links
 Awards received by Professor Muhammad Yunus and the Grameen Bank

Awards received by Muhammad Yunus
Yunus, Muhammad